Omberg is a forested mountain in the western Östergötland County in Sweden. Administratively it is split between the municipalities of Ödeshög in the south and Vadstena in the north. It lies between Lake Vättern and Lake Tåkern. Geologically the mountain is a horst. Alvastra Abbey lies at its foot. 

The western cliff of Omberg has been indicated as an ättestupa in folk history.

Geologically Omberg is a horst, a fault-bounded and uplifted block of bedrock.

References

Nature reserves in Sweden
Tourist attractions in Östergötland County
Landforms of Östergötland County
Mountains of Sweden
Horsts (geology)